Rodrigo de Souza Cardoso (born 4 March 1982), known as Souza, is a Brazilian former footballer who played as a striker.

Career

Flamengo
After being the top goal-scorer for the 2006 Brazilian Serie A, playing for Goiás, he then moved on, signing a deal with Flamengo in the beginning of 2007.

Panathinaikos
Souza moved from Flamengo to Panathinaikos in July 2008 for a sum of €3 million. He scored his first goal for the new club in a UEFA Champions League 2008–09 qualifying round match win against Sparta Praha.

Corinthians
On December 30, 2008, Souza signed a 3-year contract for Corinthians.

Career statistics
(Correct  January 2, 2012)

according to combined sources on references  and

International career
Souza has won 2 international matches for Brazil U-23. He featured against Czech Republic on January 16, 2003 and then later appeared against Egypt on January 20, 2003 in the 2003 Pre-Olympic Tournament.

Honours
Club
Vasco da Gama
Rio de Janeiro State Championship: 2003

Internacional
Rio Grande do Sul State Championship: 2005

Goiás
Goiás State Championship: 2006

Flamengo
Taça Guanabara: 2007, 2008
Rio de Janeiro State Championship: 2007, 2008

Corinthians
São Paulo State League: 2009
Brazilian Cup: 2009

Bahia
Bahia State League: 2012

National team
South American Championship (U17)
World Cup (U 17)

Individual
 Campeonato Brasileiro Série A Team of the Year: 2006
 Campeonato Brasileiro Série A top goalscorer: 2006

Achievements
 Top scorer of the 1999 Sudamericano Sub-17
 Top scorer of the Brazilian League 2006

ReferencesGuia 2006 2o Turno Brasileirão - Revista Placar Edição 1297-C''

External links
 
 Souza at Guardian Stats Centre
 Souza at GloboEsporte 

1982 births
Living people
Brazilian footballers
Brazilian expatriate footballers
Expatriate footballers in Bulgaria
Expatriate footballers in Portugal
Campeonato Brasileiro Série A players
Primeira Liga players
Super League Greece players
First Professional Football League (Bulgaria) players
Expatriate footballers in Greece
Brazilian expatriate sportspeople in Bulgaria
Madureira Esporte Clube players
Panathinaikos F.C. players
CR Vasco da Gama players
PFC CSKA Sofia players
C.S. Marítimo players
Sport Club Internacional players
Goiás Esporte Clube players
CR Flamengo footballers
Sport Club Corinthians Paulista players
Esporte Clube Bahia players
Esporte Clube Vitória players
Criciúma Esporte Clube players
Paysandu Sport Club players
Association football forwards
Footballers from Rio de Janeiro (city)